Pendleton Taylor Bryan (1862 – June 24, 1932) was a college football player and former president of the St Louis Bar Association. He played for the Princeton Tigers, captain of the 1881 team.

References

Princeton Tigers football players
19th-century players of American football
1862 births
1932 deaths
Players of American football from Missouri